The 1995 World Table Tennis Championships were held in Tianjin from May 1 to May 14, 1995.

Results

Team

Individual

References

External links
ITTF Museum

 
World Table Tennis Championships
World Table Tennis Championships
World Table Tennis Championships
Table tennis competitions in China
Table
Sports competitions in Tianjin
20th century in Tianjin